Marcos Antonio Riveros Krayacich (born 4 September 1988) is a Paraguayan footballer who plays for Cerro Porteño and the Paraguay national team as a central midfielder.

International goals

References

External links

Albirroja profile 

1988 births
Living people
Sportspeople from Asunción
Paraguayan footballers
Association football midfielders
Paraguayan Primera División players
Club Guaraní players
Club Nacional footballers
Cerro Porteño players
Argentine Primera División players
Newell's Old Boys footballers
Paraguayan expatriate footballers
Paraguayan expatriate sportspeople in Argentina
Expatriate footballers in Argentina
Paraguay international footballers